The 1980–81 season was the 82nd completed season of The Football League.

Ron Saunders completed the revival of Birmingham club Aston Villa, as they won the First Division for the first time in 71 years. Villa competed in a two-horse race with Ipswich Town during the final stages of the season, eventually finishing four points ahead of the Suffolk side. Defending champions Liverpool slipped to fifth place, but compensated for this by winning the European Cup and their first League Cup. Manchester United failed to finish in the top five, a shortcoming that cost Dave Sexton his job as manager; he was succeeded by Ron Atkinson, who had finished fourth in the league and reached the UEFA Cup quarter-finals with an impressive West Bromwich Albion side – who would suffer a rapid decline after Atkinson's departure.

Crystal Palace endured a dreadful season with just six wins, all at home. They were joined in relegation to the Second Division by Norwich City and Leicester City.

FA Cup holders West Ham United returned to the First Division by becoming Second Division champions. Also promoted were Notts County and Swansea City, the Welsh club completing a meteoric rise under John Toshack by going from the Fourth Division to the First in just four years. Both Bristol clubs were relegated, along with Preston North End.

In the Third Division, Rotherham United were champions, with Barnsley and Charlton Athletic also promoted. Hull City, Blackpool and Colchester United were relegated, as were Sheffield United, who just seven years earlier had finished sixth in the First Division.

The Fourth Division saw Southend United finish as champions, with Lincoln City, Doncaster Rovers and Wimbledon occupying the other promotion places. There were no movements between the Fourth Division and the Alliance Premier League as the re-election system went in favour of the league's bottom four clubs.

Final league tables and results 
The tables and results below are reproduced here in the exact form that they can be found at The Rec.Sport.Soccer Statistics Foundation website, with home and away statistics separated.

During the first five seasons of the league, that is, until the season 1893–94, re-election process concerned the clubs which finished in the bottom four of the league. From the 1894–95 season and until the 1920–21 season the re-election process was required of the clubs which finished in the bottom three of the league. From the 1922–23 season on it was required of the bottom two teams of both Third Division North and Third Division South. Since the Fourth Division was established in the 1958–59 season, the re-election process has concerned the bottom four clubs in that division.

First Division

Aston Villa came top of a hotly contested title race to clinch their first top division title since 1910, using only 14 players throughout the season, with only eight scorers. Runners-up Ipswich Town had compensation for their failed title challenge in the shape of a UEFA Cup triumph, and were also semi-finalists in the FA Cup, their relatively small squad struggling in the final weeks of the season as a challenge for three major trophies took its toll. Arsenal finished third, while West Bromwich Albion enjoyed another strong season and finished fourth. Liverpool finished fifth but won their third European Cup and their first League Cup.

Manchester United's failure to finish higher than eighth in the league cost manager Dave Sexton his job after four trophyless seasons in charge, and a lengthy search for a new manager saw West Bromwich Albion's Ron Atkinson named as his successor. Everton appointed their former player Howard Kendall as manager after a disappointing 15th-place finish. Tottenham, meanwhile, only finished 10th in the league but achieved a sixth triumph in the FA Cup at the expense of Manchester City, who climbed up to 12th place in the league after an upturn in fortunes brought about the October change of manager from Malcolm Allison to John Bond.

Bond's former club Norwich City went down to the Second Division along with Leicester City and Crystal Palace.

Final table

Results

Managerial changes

Maps

Second Division
A year after winning the FA Cup, West Ham ended their three-year exile from the First Division by clinching the Second Division title. Notts County, who finished second, went up after 55 years away from the First Division. Third placed Swansea City completed an unprecedented four-season climb from the Fourth Division to the First Division, where they had never previously played. Blackburn Rovers missed out on promotion on goal difference, and then lost their promising young player-manager Howard Kendall to Everton.

Both Bristol clubs went down along with Preston North End.

Results

Maps

Third Division

Results

Maps

Fourth Division

Results

Maps

Election/Re-election to the Football League
Altrincham won the Alliance Premier League for the second season running and earned the right to apply for election to the Football League to replace one of the four bottom sides in the 1980–81 Football League Fourth Division. The vote went as follows:

As a result of this, all four Football League teams were re-elected, and Altrincham were denied membership of the League.

See also
 1980-81 in English football

References

Ian Laschke: Rothmans Book of Football League Records 1888–89 to 1978–79. Macdonald and Jane's, London & Sydney, 1980.

 
English Football League seasons